Kaduwela may refer to:

 Kaduwela, Western Province, Sri Lanka
 Kaduwela, Central Province, Sri Lanka
 Kaduwela Divisional Secretariat, Western Province, Sri Lanka
 Kaduwela Electoral District, Sri Lanka, in existence from 1977 to 1989